Death Machine is a 1994 science fiction horror film written and directed by Stephen Norrington.  It stars Brad Dourif, Ely Pouget, William Hootkins, John Sharian, and Richard Brake. Rachel Weisz, still early in her career at the time of the film's release, appears briefly in the role of a Junior Executive. The film was the directorial debut of Norrington, who had previously worked as a special effects artist on films such as Lifeforce, Aliens, Hardware, The Witches, and Split Second. However, Norrington infamously expressed dissatisfaction with the original cut, and the film has undergone numerous re-edits since.

The film garnered controversy for both its excessive violence and Dourif's character. These factors resulted in the film being banned in several countries, including Sri Lanka, Iran, China, Malaysia, Iraq, and Australia. Despite the controversy, the film received mixed reviews. Many critics praised the special effects, but criticized the acting and plot.

Plot
In 2003, the controversial megacorporation Chaank Armaments is the world's leading manufacturer of cutting-edge weapons and military hardware. A cybernetically-enhanced supersoldier, codenamed "Hard Man", malfunctions and massacres the patrons of a roadside diner before being detained by security operatives led by John Carpenter. Public outcry ensues following the incident, the majority of complaints directed at the company's new chief executive Hayden Cale.

Chairman of the Board Scott Ridley, fearful of the potential termination of Chaank's contracts due to the bad publicity, tries to cover up the incident and numerous issues with Project: Hard Man itself. Cale demands immediate and full public disclosure, having purposely leaked a number of top-secret documents to the press in defiance of Ridley's attempts to suppress knowledge about his shadier activities. She also demands for Jack Dante, a deranged weapon designer and lead developer of Project: Hard Man, to be fired. Despite Carpenter's acknowledgement of the project's numerous fatal flaws, the board simply ignores Cale's requests, no one seeming to care about her interests except for Dante himself. Cale is warned by a junior executive about Dante's unstable behavior and the fate of Nicholson, her late predecessor. Cale goes to confront him, demanding to know about Dante's secret project in Vault 10, for which he never submits progress reports on. Far from cooperative,  he instead threatens Cale. Dante blackmails her with detailed knowledge of Cale's living situation, place of residence, and personal information. Cale asks Ridley for help, but he refuses while telling her that Nicholson took a similar interest in Dante's work. However, he was killed in a mysterious accident believed to have been an animal mauling. During their confrontation, Cale manages to lift Ridley's access card so she can investigate on her own. Dante learns that Cale has the card and confronts Ridley, subsequently killing him with a mysterious weapon.

Meanwhile, a trio of eco-warriors (Raimi, Weyland, and Yutani) infiltrate the Chaank headquarters in order to destroy its digitally-stored assets and send the company into bankruptcy. Carpenter calls Cale after finding Ridley's mutilated corpse which had an implanted life-sign transmitter. She investigates Ridley's death and discovers that whatever killed him came from Vault 10. Taking matters into her own hands, she terminates Dante's employment and seals the vault. Dante is about to shoot her when the eco-warriors show up and take everyone hostage. They demand access to the building's secure area in order to destroy the company's digital bonds, but Cale refuses to cooperate. Raimi goes to their alternate plan to cut through the bulkhead leading to the containment area. Dante, sensing his chance, "helps" them by suggesting they cut through one of the vaults surrounding the containment instead, suggesting they start at Vault 10.

Once the vault is open, Dante jumps in and activates his invention called the Frontline Morale Destroyer (a.k.a. "Warbeast"), which promptly kills Weyland. Raimi flees, meeting up with Yutani as well as the subdued Cale and Carpenter. Dante broadcasts his demands over the monitor system, demanding that his employment be reinstated and Cale to "interface with him on a regular basis".

Raimi and Yutani cancel their operation in an attempt to escape from the building, along with Carpenter and Cale. Carpenter is killed by the Warbeast inside of a lift. Later on, Raimi, Yutani, and Cale manage to reach the top floor of the building, which holds classified items, whose existence even Cale is unaware of. Among the classified items are the primary components of Project: Hard Man, including advanced weaponry and armour. Raimi suits up and downloads the Hard Man data into his brain. Fighting off the Warbeast, he manages to slow it down enough to allow an escape via an outdoor service elevator. Yutani, however, is killed by the Warbeast after hitting his head and falling in front of it. Once Raimi and Cale make it back to the surface, they have an encounter with a police officer who is quickly killed by the Warbeast as it leaped down from the rooftop. It chases Cale and Raimi back into the building. Fortunately, Raimi is able to partially incapacitate the Warbeast. However, the explosion knocks him unconscious. The machine takes Cale back to Dante. During their conversation, Raimi regains consciousness and subdues Dante. The two escape, and Hayden traps Dante inside of Vault 10 with his own Warbeast. A closing shot of Vault 10's reinforced door implies that Dante is now being hunted by his creation.

Cast
 Brad Dourif as Jack Dante
 Ely Pouget as Hayden Cale
 William Hootkins as John Carpenter
 John Sharian as Raimi
 Martin McDougall as Yutani
 Andreas Wisniewski as Weyland
 Richard Brake as Scott Ridley
 Rachel Weisz as Junior Executive

Awards

Sitges Film Festival

Fantafestival

References

External links

 

1994 films
1994 horror films
1990s science fiction films 
British science fiction films

1990s English-language films
Robot films 
British science fiction action films
1994 directorial debut films
Films shot at Pinewood Studios
Films directed by Stephen Norrington
Films set in the future
Films set in 2003
1990s British films